Kort Grocery, also known as Camp Springs Grocery, is a historic property located on Four Mile Road in Camp Springs, Kentucky, a rural area of Campbell County, Kentucky. The stone building was constructed by Peter Kort in 1880 as part of a settlement built by German immigrants. The structure was added to the United States National Register of Historic Places in 1983.

It was built as a grocery store.  It is a -story stone commercial store and residence built along a hillside.  Its five-bay front faces Four Mile Pike.

References

German-American culture in Kentucky
National Register of Historic Places in Campbell County, Kentucky
Commercial buildings on the National Register of Historic Places in Kentucky
Grocery store buildings
Retail buildings in Kentucky
1880 establishments in Kentucky
Commercial buildings completed in 1880